Jaime Stein (born 1978 in Vancouver, British Columbia) is a Canadian radio play-by-play broadcaster who formerly called games for the Toronto Argonauts of the Canadian Football League. He called four games on MOJO Radio during the 2004 season and was named the primary "voice of the Argonauts" for the 2005 and 2006 seasons on what became AM640 - Toronto Radio. Prior to joining the Toronto Argonauts, Stein was an Editorial Assistant at The Sports Network (TSN).

Stein began his radio career at CFRC-FM, the campus radio station of Queen's University in Kingston, Ontario, Canada. He was a colour commentator for Queen's Golden Gaels Football broadcasts in addition to hosting the pre and post game shows. He also established "The CIS National Roundtable" discussion on university football that featured Daryl Wener, Arash Madani and Alex J. Walling. Stein expanded his broadcasting duties to include play-by-play of Queen's Golden Gaels men's and women's ice hockey.

Stein holds a degree in Journalism (2003) from Ryerson University in Toronto and a Bachelor of Arts degree (2000) from McGill University in Montreal.

In 2007, Stein became a contributing columnist for the Canadian Football League's website and in 2008 emerged into his new role as the Canadian Football League's Manager of Digital Media.

References

External links
Official website
Jaime Stein's CFL.ca columns
 

1978 births
Canadian radio sportscasters
Canadian Football League announcers
Toronto Argonauts personnel
Living people
People from Vancouver
Toronto Metropolitan University alumni
McGill University alumni